William or Bill Monroe  may refer to:

 Bill Monroe (1911–1996), American bluegrass musician
 Bill Monroe (1900s infielder) (c. 1877–1915), Negro league baseball player
 Bill Monroe (1920s infielder), Negro league baseball player
 Bill Monroe (journalist) (1920–2011), American journalist and NBC News correspondent
 William Newton Monroe (fl. 1879–1881), founder of Monrovia, California
 William Monroe, for whom William Monroe High School in Virginia was named in 1925
 William T. Monroe, United States Ambassador to Bahrain in 2004–2007
William Monroe, character in the 2020 film Inheritance

See also
William Monroe Trotter (1872–1934), American banker and activist
William Monroe Trotter House, a Boston landmark
William Munroe (disambiguation)